Joao Augusto de Araujo Castro (August 27, 1919,  Rio de Janeiro – December 9, 1975, Washington, D.C.) was a Brazilian lawyer and diplomat, serving as Brazilian Ambassador to the US and UN, and Minister of Foreign Affairs during the government of João Goulart.

1919 births
1975 deaths
People from Rio de Janeiro (city)
Foreign ministers of Brazil
Brazilian diplomats
Permanent Representatives of Brazil to the United Nations
Ambassadors of Brazil to the United States